Neil Burgess may refer to:
 Neil Burgess (comedian) (1846–1910), American vaudevillian comedian
 Neil Burgess (neuroscientist) (born 1966), professor at University College London
 Neil Burgess Jr. (1918–1997), American aircraft propulsion engineer and designer
 Neil Burgess, actor known for Cillit Bang adverts